The 2010–11 Akron Zips men's basketball team represented the University of Akron during the 2010–11 NCAA Division I men's basketball season. The Zips, led by seventh year head coach Keith Dambrot, played their home games at the James A. Rhodes Arena as members of the East Division of the Mid-American Conference(MAC). They finished the season 23–13, 9–7 in MAC play to finish in fourth place in the East Division. They won the MAC tournament after defeating Kent State in overtime in the championship game. They received an automatic bid to the NCAA tournament as a fifteen seed in the southeast regional where they lost in the first round to the #2 seeded Notre Dame.

Roster

Schedule
 
|-
!colspan=9 style=| Exhibition

|-
!colspan=9 style=| Regular season

|-
!colspan=9 style=| MAC tournament

|-
!colspan=9 style=| NCAA tournament

References

Akron Zips men's basketball seasons
Akron
Akron